"My Favorite Memory" is a song written and recorded by American country music artist Merle Haggard, his twenty-fifth number one single.  It was released in September 1981 as the first single from the album Big City.  The single stayed at number one for one week and spent a total of ten weeks on the country chart.

Charts

References

1981 singles
1981 songs
Merle Haggard songs
Songs written by Merle Haggard
Epic Records singles